The Marquesan imperial pigeon (Ducula galeata), also known as the Nukuhiva pigeon or Upe, is a pigeon which is endemic to Nuku Hiva in the Marquesas Islands of French Polynesia. This pigeon is only found in some valleys in the western part of that island.

Description
This is the largest pigeon outside of the crowned pigeons, as it weighs approximately 900 grams (2 lb). This species is heavily built with a large bill and long, broad tail. The wings are broad and rounded in shape.

The Marquesan imperial pigeon is sooty-gray on the head, throat and breast, with a white band just behind the bill that can be seen from some distance. The belly is slightly browner in color than the rest of the underside. The upperparts, wings and tail are glossy green with a bluish tint. The underside of both the tail and the wings are black. The bill is black, with a swollen cere that gives the face a unique sloping look just above the bill.

This bird has an cooing advertising call that consist of a loud, deep, guttural 'neah-ah, neah-ah, neah-ah, neah-ah or naw-aw, naw-naw or uh-wah, uh-wah, uh-wah. This call is so deep in timber that it is sometimes described as cow-like. A call, probably consisting of an excitement call, has been described as a crow-like krawk, krawk.

Habitat
This was originally distributed throughout its native island, which at one time was almost completely covered in forest. A few on the island may still turn in sea-level forested groves and woods surrounded banana and orange plantations. Before ancient Polynesian settlers arrived there, subfossil bones show there was also a population of this bird on Henderson Island in the Pitcairn Islands.

Biology
The Marquesan imperial pigeon is normally seen singly or in pairs, often while perched around a fruiting tree. The species is not noticeably shy and may allow fairly close approach while feeding. Favored foods including Mangifera indica (a mango), Psidium guajava (a guava) and numerous smaller fruit of the genera Ficus, Cordia and Eugenia. It often spends much of the day perched in tree canopies, often on or near cliffs. It flies to new foraging sites over forested ridges with deep, labored wing beats. While gliding it may fly with wings held quite far back and when descending to land below, it holds its wings along flat against its body.

Nests have been observed in May, July, September and October, indicating that nesting may occur nearly year-around, or that breeding activities peak around the middle of the year. A single glossy white egg is laid. No further information is known of the species breeding habits.

Status
Formerly classified by the IUCN as a critically endangered species with an estimated population of less than 150 adult birds, it was suspected to be more numerous than generally assumed. Following the evaluation of its population status, with an estimated 150 to 300 birds in total on the island, and it is consequently downlisted to Endangered status in 2008; it is still an exceedingly rare bird, but successful conservation measures have averted the threat of immediate extinction at least for the time being. It was probably never common. Some authorities have claimed that the species once existed on other Marquesan islands, including Cook Islands, Society Islands and Pitcairn Islands. However, most now agree that these extinct forms were probably other species in the genus Ducula. The species has been greatly depleted by habitat degradation.

References

External links
 BirdLife Species Factsheet

Marquesan imperial pigeon
Birds of the Marquesas Islands
Marquesan imperial pigeon
Marquesan imperial pigeon
Endemic fauna of French Polynesia
Endemic birds of French Polynesia